Vukmir is a Slavic male given name and surname. It is derived from the Slavic noun vuk (wolf) and mir (peace). It is one of many Serbian given names derived from vuk. All the derivatives from vuk were regarded as apotropaic names. At least 66 people with the surname died at the Jasenovac concentration camp. It may refer to:

People 
Leah Vukmir (born 1958), American politician
Dragan Vukmir (born 1978), Serbian footballer

Fictional characters 
Vukmir, portrayed by Sergej Trifunović, is the main fictional villain from the 2010 controversial Serbian movie A Serbian Film

See also
Vladimir Velmar-Janković, writer, pen name "Jorge Vukmir"

References

Bulgarian masculine given names
Croatian masculine given names
Macedonian masculine given names
Slavic masculine given names
Slovene masculine given names
Serbian surnames
Serbian masculine given names
Ukrainian masculine given names